Nyamari Ongegu (born April 8, 1981) known professionally as Nyashinski is a Kenyan rapper and songwriter. He is a co-founding member of a hip hop trio Kleptomaniax.

Biography
Nyashinski who was born as Nyamari Ogengu on April 8, 1981 in Kisii, Kenya, attended at Nairobi School. On 10th April, 2019, Nyashinski whose full birth name was Inyatta Nyamari Ongegu, through a gazette notice announced legally abandoning the use of his first name, Inyatta, instead opted to use Nyamari Ongegu only as his official full name.

Nyashinski lived in Kenya until 2006, when he, a 21 year old teenager and a member of a rap trio, Kleptomaniax and his family relocated to Delaware, USA where he worked as a truck driver for 10 years until his return to Kenya to continue his music career in 2016.

In 2019, Nyashinski tied the knot, marrying his longtime girlfriend designer, Zia Jepkemei Bett. Nyashinski and Zia welcomed their first child in 2020.

Music career

Kleptomaniax

Nyashinski's music career started as a member of Kleptomaniax when he was still a high school student at Nairobi School, where he met Roba (Robert Manyasa) and Collo (Collins Majale) who formed a music trio, Kleptomaniax back in 1999. Although both members were still the high school students, they released their debut track, Freak It in 2002 under Ogopa DJs music label, followed by Maniax Anthem and Haree which were major hits at a time. Tuendelee released in 2004 was one of the most popular song by the trio earning the trio a dozen of awards and nominations, The trio disbanded in 2009 as both members opted to pursue solo careers.

Solo career
Nyashinski had a 10 year break from music activity right after Kleptomaniax disbandment, he made a come back in 2016 with a hit song Now you Know. His 2017 song Malaika scooped a Mdundo Award for Most Dowloaded Male Single in 2017.

Awards and nominations

Pulse Music Video Awards

|-
|2016
|Pulse Music Video Awards
|Now you Know
|

MTV Africa Music Awards

|-
|2017
|Himself
|Best African Act
|
|-
|2018
|Himself
|Best African Act
|

All Africa Music Awards

|-
|2022
|Himself
|Best Male artiste in Eastern Africa
|

East Africa Arts Entertainment Awards

|-
|2022
|Himself
|Best Legendary artiste
|

Discography

2020 Album

Other Singles
2016
Now You Know
Mungu Pekee

2017
Malaika
Hayawani
Aminia

2018
Bebi Bebi
Free
Hello
Finyo

2019
Marathon Runner
Lift Me Up
Balance

2020
Serious
Hapo Tu (ft Chris Kaiga)

2021
Properly ft (Femi one)
Top Form
Goals
Whoopty (freestyle)

2022
Showman
Night school
Kable Tudie
Tunnel Vision

References

External links

1981 births
Living people
Kenyan rappers
People from Kisii County
Kenyan musicians